God Has a Plan for Us All is the first full-length album by Angtoria, released on 8 May 2006.
It was received well by the international media and the special edition of the album sold-out soon after its release date (it was limited to 3,000 copies worldwide).
The band recorded a video for the title track.
Lyrical themes deal mostly with child abuse, self-harm and abuse in general. The lyrics for the album are very personal.
According to Sarah Jezebel Deva, "the title refers to that despite what happens, religious people always back themselves up with: 'God has a plan for us all' and 'It is as He wills it.' "

Track listing
All Songs Arranged By Sarah Jezebel Deva, Chris Rehn & Tommy Rehn.
 The Awakening (1:31) (Deva, T. Rehn)
 I'm Calling (4:57) (Deva, T. Rehn, C. Rehn)
 God Has a Plan for Us All (4:33) (Deva, T. Rehn, C. Rehn)
 Suicide On My Mind (3:51) (Deva, C. Rehn)
 Deity of Disgust (5:00) (with Martin Häggström of ZooL) (Deva, T. Rehn, C. Rehn)
 The Addiction (3:27) (Deva, C. Rehn)
 Six Feet Under's Not Deep Enough (4:15) (Deva, C. Rehn)
 Do You See Me Now (4:25) (Deva, C. Rehn)
 Original Sin (3:39) (with Aaron Stainthorpe of My Dying Bride) (Deva, T. Rehn, C. Rehn, Stainthorpe)
 Hell Hath No Fury Like a Woman Scorned (4:43) (Deva, C. Rehn)
 Confide in Me (Kylie Minogue cover) (4:14) (Steve Anderson, David Seaman)
 That's What the Wise Lady Said (4:31) (Deva, C. Rehn)
 A Child That Walks in the Path of a Man (Limited Edition Bonus Track)

Production
Produced By Chris & Tommy Rehn
Engineers: Chris & Tommy Rehn, Micke Ohlen, Mark Harwood (Vocals & Bass), Daniel Bergstrand (Drums)
Mixing: Daniel Bergstrand, Micke Ohlen, Chris Rehn, Tommy Rehn
Vocal Editing: Eric S.
Mastering: Bjorn Engelmann

Personnel
Sarah Jezebel Deva: Female Vocals
Aaron Stainthorpe: Male Vocal on "Original Sin"
Tony Konberg: Additional Male Vocals
Chris Rehn: Acoustic & Electric Guitars, Keyboards, Bass, Programming
Tommy Rehn: Acoustic & Electric Guitars, Keyboards, Bass, Programming
Richard Anderson: Keyboards
Dave Pybus: Bass
Andreas Brobjer: Drums, Percussion

2006 albums
Angtoria albums
Listenable Records albums
Self-harm in fiction